Francis Wayland Glen (September 5, 1836 – May 5, 1912) was a manufacturer and political figure in Ontario, Canada. He represented Ontario South in the House of Commons of Canada from 1878 to 1887 as a Liberal member.

He was born in Minaville, New York, the son of Elijah McKinney Glen, of Scottish descent, and was educated in Rochester. Glen married Harriet Frances Hall in Rochester. He managed the Hall Works in Oshawa, which had been established by his father-in-law, Joseph Hall, and which produced iron implements. After the failure of the business, Glen returned to New York and died there at the age of 75.

References 
 
The Canadian parliamentary companion, 1883, JA Gemmill

External links 
 Historic Sketches of Oshawa (1921) Kaiser, TE (pdf)

1836 births
1912 deaths
Members of the House of Commons of Canada from Ontario
Liberal Party of Canada MPs